Stoneridge is a census-designated place (CDP) in Cibola County, New Mexico, United States. It was first listed as a CDP prior to the 2020 census.

Stoneridge is on the northern edge of Cibola County, on the north side of Bluewater Lake and its outlet stream, Bluewater Creek. The western half of the CDP is in Bluewater Lake State Park. The CDP is bordered to the north by the community of Homer C Jones in McKinley County.

Demographics

References 

Census-designated places in Cibola County, New Mexico
Census-designated places in New Mexico